Eberhard Schmalzl (born 12 June 1950 in Brixen) is an Italian former alpine skier who competed in the 1972 Winter Olympics.

References

External links
 

1950 births
Living people
Italian male alpine skiers
Olympic alpine skiers of Italy
Alpine skiers at the 1972 Winter Olympics
Germanophone Italian people
Sportspeople from Brixen